was a district located in Shimane Prefecture, Japan.

As of 2004, the population before dissolution was 4,315 with the total area of 432.72 km2.

Former towns and villages
Hikimi
Mito

Merger
On November 1, 2004 - the towns of Hikimi and Mito were merged into the expanded city of Masuda. Therefore, Mino District was dissolved as a result of this merger.

See also
List of dissolved districts of Japan

Mino District